The Turkmenistan Futsal League (turkm. Türkmenistanyň futzal ligasy), is the top league for Futsal in Turkmenistan. The winning team obtains the participation right to the AFC Futsal Club Championship.

Competition format 
The Turkmenistan Futsal League 2021 features a total of 8 teams, who have been played each other in two rounds. The season runs from June to December 2021.

Champions 
 2017: Talyp sport Ashgabat
 2016: Ahal Änew
 2015: Denizchi Turkmenbashi
 2014: Galkan Ashgabat
 2013: Arvana Ashgabat
 2012: Galkan Ashgabat
 2011: Arvana Ashgabat
 2009-10: Arvana Ashgabat
 2008-09: Fakel Ahal Änew
 2007-08: Arvana Ashgabat
 2006: Asudalyk Ashgabat
 2005: Melik Ashgabat
 2004: Turan Dashoguz

See also 

 AFC Futsal club championship
 Football Federation of Turkmenistan
 Turkmenistan national futsal team
 Turkmenistan Futsal Cup

References

Futsal in Turkmenistan
Sports leagues in Turkmenistan